is a passenger railway station in the city of Sodegaura, Chiba Prefecture, Japan, operated by the East Japan Railway Company (JR East).

Lines
Higashi-Yokota Station is served by the Kururi Line, and is located 10.8 km from the western terminus of the line at Kisarazu Station.

Station layout
The station consists of a single side platform serving bidirectional traffic. The platform is short, and can only handle trains with a length of four carriages or less. The station is unattended.

History
Higashi-Yokota Station was opened on April 20, 1937. The station was closed on January 20, 1947, but was reopened on April 1, 1958. The station was absorbed into the JR East network upon the privatization of the JNR on April 1, 1987. A new station building was completed in January 2007.

Passenger statistics
In fiscal 2006, the station was used by an average of 156 passengers daily (boarding passengers only).

Surrounding area
 
 
former Hirakawa Town Hall

See also
 List of railway stations in Japan

References

External links

  JR East Station information

Railway stations in Japan opened in 1937
Railway stations in Chiba Prefecture
Kururi Line
Sodegaura